The electoral district of Townsville North was a Legislative Assembly electorate in the state of Queensland, Australia.

History
Townsville North was created in the 1959 redistribution, taking effect at the 1960 state election. The Electoral district of Townsville was split into Townsville North and Townsville South.

Townsville North was abolished at the 1972 state election, the outer portion forming the newly recreated Electoral district of Townsville and the inner city portion forming part of the new Electoral district of Townsville West.

Members

The following people were elected in the seat of Townsville North:

Election results

See also
 Electoral districts of Queensland
 Members of the Queensland Legislative Assembly by year
 :Category:Members of the Queensland Legislative Assembly by name

References

Former electoral districts of Queensland
1960 establishments in Australia
1972 disestablishments in Australia